Jóhannes Haukur Jóhannesson (born 26 February 1980) is an Icelandic actor known for his roles in the TV series Game of Thrones and The Innocents and in the films Atomic Blonde and Alpha.

Filmography

Film

Television

References

External links 
 

Living people
1980 births
Icelandic male film actors
21st-century Icelandic male actors